Levi Alexander Laing (born 12 April 2003) is an English professional footballer who plays as a centre-back for West Ham United.

Club career
Laing is a youth product of the academies of Hampton & Richmond Borough and Brentford, before moving to Arsenal's youth academy in 2016. He signed a scholarship contract with Arsenal in July 2019. He joined West Ham United on trial in January 2021, and was formally released by Arsenal in the summer of 2021. He signed a professional contract with West Ham United on 1 July 2021 for 2+1 seasons. He made his senior and professional debut with West Ham United as a substitute in a 4–0 UEFA Europa Conference League win over AEK Larnaca on 16 March 2023.

International career
Laing is a youth international for England, having played up to the England U16s.

Playing style
Laing is an all-round centre-back who can also play as a right-back or defensive midfielder as needed. He is a technical and uncompromising player with strong athleticism, and who loves to defend.

References

External links
 
 West Ham profile

2003 births
Living people
Footballers from Kingston upon Thames
English footballers
England youth international footballers
English sportspeople of Jamaican descent
Association football defenders
Arsenal F.C. players
West Ham United F.C. players
Black British sportsmen